Khandaker Mosharraf Hossain (born 1 October 1946) is a Bangladesh Nationalist Party politician and geologist. He represented Comilla-2 constituency as a Jatiya Sangsad member during 1991–2006.

Early life and education 
Hossain was born in Goyeshpur village, in the Bengal Presidency, British India to Khandaker Ashraf Ali and Hosne Ara Hasna Hena.

Hossain earned an MSc degree from University of Dhaka in 1968 and another MSc degree from Imperial College (then under University of London) in 1970. He obtained the PhD degree in geology in 1973 from University of London and DIC from Imperial College in 1974. He was the chairman of the Department of Geology, University of Dhaka from 1987 to 1991.

Career

Academic
Hossain joined the University of Dhaka faculty as a junior lecturer in the Department of Geology in 1967. He became a professor in the same department in 1986.

Politics
Hossain has been a member of the Standing Committee of the Bangladesh Nationalist Party (BNP) since 1994. He was elected as a Jatiya Sangsad member from the Comilla-2 constituency in the national elections for four terms since 1991. He was the Minister of Energy and Mineral Resources and Home Affairs during 1991–1996. He was also the Minister of Health and Family Welfare during the preceding Four Party Alliance government.

Hossain was the chairman of the 56th World Health Assembly (WHA) in 2002. He was awarded with the "World No Tobacco Award" by the World Health Organization during the 57th WHA for his contribution to the anti-tobacco campaign in Bangladesh.

Personal life
Hossain is married to Bilquis Akther Hossain. They have two sons Khandaker Mahbub Hossain and Khandaker Maruf Hossain, and one daughter Mahzabin Khandaker and 4 grandson Khandaker Mashraf Hossain,Rishan Islam,Khandaker Mishraq Hossain and Khandaker Miraf Hossain,including 1 Granddaughter Mihira Siara Khandaker.

References

1946 births
Living people
People from Comilla
University of Dhaka alumni
Academic staff of the University of Dhaka
Alumni of the University of London
Bangladeshi geologists
Bangladesh Nationalist Party politicians
Power, Energy and Mineral Resources ministers
Home Affairs ministers of Bangladesh
Health and Family Welfare ministers of Bangladesh
5th Jatiya Sangsad members
6th Jatiya Sangsad members
7th Jatiya Sangsad members
8th Jatiya Sangsad members